8-pallo is a 2013 Finnish film directed by Aku Louhimies and based on a crime novel Elävien kirjoihin by Marko Kilpi.

Plot
The film tells the story of a single mother Pike (Jessica Grabowsky) who, having just been released from prison, is trying to start her life anew. When her former boyfriend Lalli (Eero Aho) comes back from abroad, it opens a window into a past that Pike wants to put behind her.

Cast
Jessica Grabowsky as Pike
Eero Aho as Lalli
Pirkka-Pekka Petelius as Elias Kaski
Mikko Leppilampi as Olli Repo
Jakob Öhrman as Limppu
 as Tiina
Mikko Kouki as Halonen
 as Tärpätti
Kari Ketonen as Ivakka
 as Ilkka

References

External links
 ELONET – 8-pallo
 

Finnish crime drama films
2013 films
Films based on crime novels
Films based on Finnish novels
Films directed by Aku Louhimies
2010s Finnish-language films